Legacy Award(s) may refer to:

 Bruce Prentice Legacy Award, an award presented by the Ontario Sports Hall of Fame
 Children's Literature Legacy Award, a prize awarded by the Association for Library Service to Children
 Hurston/Wright Legacy Award, a program that honors Black writers, hosted and organized by the Hurston/Wright Foundation
 Legacy Awards (NLBM), a series of awards presented annually by the Negro Leagues Baseball Museum

See also